The action of 6 May 1801 was a minor naval engagement between the 32-gun xebec-frigate El Gamo of the Spanish Navy under the command of Don Francisco de Torres and the much smaller 14-gun brig  under the command of Thomas, Lord Cochrane. El Gamo was captured despite being four times as large, with much greater firepower and a crew six times the size of Speedy, which had a reduced crew of 54 at the time of the engagement.

Background
In March 1800 Commander Lord Cochrane took command of Speedy; he had been operating in the Mediterranean and had fought many actions from its base in Port Mahon in Menorca.

Speedy was cruising off Barcelona at dawn on 6 May 1801 when a large enemy frigate was sighted. The frigate, a xebec-rigged vessel named Gamo, commanded by Don Francisco de Torres and carrying 319 men, was armed with 8- and 12-pounder guns, with 24-pounder carronades. This amounted to a total broadside of 190 pounds, more than seven times that of Speedy. Gamo had "22 long 12-pounders, 8 9-pounders and 2 heavy carronades". Furthermore, Cochrane had only 54 men on board Speedy, having sent men away as prize crews for ships previously taken.

Battle
Instead of evading the Spanish frigate, Cochrane closed on her, and at 9.30 a.m. Gamo fired a gun and hoisted Spanish colours. In return Cochrane hoisted American colours. The Spanish hesitated, allowing Cochrane to get closer, hoist British colours, and evade the first broadside. Gamo fired another, which Cochrane again evaded, holding fire until Speedy ran alongside her and locked her yards in her rigging. Gamo attempted to fire upon her smaller opponent, but her guns were mounted too high and could not be depressed sufficiently, causing their shot to pass through Speedys sails and rigging. Cochrane then opened fire with his 4-pounders double- and treble-shotted, their shots passing up through the sides and decks, the first broadside killing the Spanish captain and boatswain.

Seeing their disadvantage the Spanish second-in-command assembled a boarding party, at which Cochrane drew off, pounded their massed ranks with shot and musket fire, before drawing in close again. After having their attempts to board frustrated three times, the Spanish returned to their guns. Cochrane then decided to board the Gamo, and assembled his entire crew into two parties, leaving only the ship's doctor to command and crew Speedy. The British then rushed the Gamo, boarding from bow and waist, the boarders at the bow had their faces blackened to look like pirates. The Spanish faltered at this, and were then set-upon by the party that had boarded from the waist. There was a hard-fought battle between the two crews, until Cochrane called down to the doctor, at the time the only person on Speedy, ordering him to send the rest of the men over. At the same time, he ordered the Spanish colours to be torn down. Thinking that their officers had surrendered the ship, the remaining Spanish seamen stopped fighting.

Aftermath
The British had lost three men killed and nine wounded, while the Spanish had lost 14 killed and 41 wounded, with the rest captured; a total casualty list exceeding Speedys entire complement. The British then secured the Spanish prisoners below deck and made their way back to Port Mahon, Minorca. Finding that he had been beaten by such an inferior foe, the Spanish second-in-command asked Cochrane for a certificate assuring him that he had done all he could to defend his ship. Cochrane obliged, with the equivocal wording that he had 'conducted himself like a true Spaniard'. El Gamo was subsequently sold to the ruler of Algiers as a merchantman.

In fiction
This battle inspired Patrick O'Brian in his novel Master and Commander, where, as the first major battle led by his main character Jack Aubrey, in a very similar manner, the brig HMS Sophie escapes from and then lures and captures the Spanish Xebeque-frigate Cacafuego.

References

Bibliography

External links
 HMS Speedy vs El Gamo
 Thomas Cochrane – the sea-captain and inspiration for Horatio Hornblower

Conflicts in 1801
1801 in Spain
Naval battles involving the United Kingdom
Naval battles involving Spain
Naval battles of the Napoleonic Wars
May 1801 events